ReMastered: The Lion's Share is a 2019 documentary film about the search by Rian Malan, a South African journalist, for the original writers of the famous song "The Lion Sleeps Tonight".

Premise
The documentary takes a look at the controversy and legal battles around the song "The Lion Sleeps Tonight", which is one of the most recognisable songs in all pop music. The search for the song's roots in this documentary is done by the South African journalist Rian Malan.

Cast
 Rian Malan
 Solomon Linda
 Delphi Linda
 Elizabeth Linda
 Fildah Linda
 Hanro Friedrich
 Rob Allingham
 Glen Dean
 Owen Dean
 Paul Jenkins, CEO of Johnnic Entertainment, which owns the South African label Gallo Records
 Pallo Jordan
 Mandla Mhlongo
 Nick Motsatse
 Zee Nzama
 Geoff Paynter

References

External links

 
 
 

2019 documentary films
2019 films
Netflix original documentary films
2010s English-language films